Starsys as a term could refer to the following:

Convergent Technologies Operating System
Starsys Company - Merging with SpaceDev